

Great Britain
Bahamas – John Tinker, Governor of the Bahamas (1740–1758)
Bengal – Adam Dawson, President of Bengal (1749–1752)

Portugal
 Angola – António de Almeida, Governor of Angola (1749–1753)
 Macau – Diogo Fernandes Salema e Saldanha, Governor of Macau (1749–1752)

Colonial governors
Colonial governors
1750